The Intersegmental General Education Transfer Curriculum (IGETC) is an educational plan for California community college students designed to facilitate transferring to a four-year public university. Public universities include all UC and CSU schools. The IGETC is created by the Intersegmental Committee of the Academic Senates (ICAS).

Completion of the IGETC will permit a student to transfer without the need to take additional general education courses at their university. This enables a student to focus only on their major once accepted into a UC or CSU.

The IGETC is not an admission requirement into a university. The IGETC is a recommended certification that students receive from community college. Students that complete the IGETC are waived from general breadth courses in their university. By waiving these classes students can save money by fulfilling general education requirements in a cheaper institution.

The IGETC requires completion of a varying amount of courses with a C (or a 2.0 out of a 4.0 scale) grade or better in each class. Students can choose to take classes across any California Community College campuses. They must fulfill a certain number of units from each of these areas: English Communication, Mathematical Concepts and Quantitative Reasoning, Arts and Humanities, Social and Behavior Sciences, Physical and Biological Sciences, and Foreign Language. AP and IB credit may be used to fulfill course requirements.

Different community colleges use different titles for courses. For example,  English Composition is known as “English 101”  in one campus and “English 1A” in another. Unfortunately, there is no universal list of classes with numbers. Students need to match the class description in their catalog. To see if a class transfers from California community college to a UC or CSU, it is recommended to use assist.org, the official statewide database of articulation between educational institutions.

Also, there are slight differences between the requirements for a UC and CSU. For example, a CSU requires oral communication while a UC would not.

A number of non-public and/or non-Californian universities also accept IGETC. These include, but are not limited to: Arizona State University, University of La Verne, University of the Pacific, and others.

The curriculum includes requirements in English, math, arts and humanities, social and behavioral sciences, and foreign language.

History
The Intersegmental General Education Transfer Curriculum (IGETC) began in 1991. During the 1980s, a commission was tasked with reviewing the Master Plan for Higher Education and legislators' and students' concerns regarding transfers between 2-year community colleges and 4-year institutions. Faculty from community colleges and member institutions of the University of California system and California State University system convened to develop a "statewide, lower-division general education transfer curriculum applicable to all California Community College (CCC) students transferring to a California State University (CSU) or University of California (UC) campus".

References

External links 
 IGETC.ORG Official IGETC Website
 Welcome to ASSIST Assist.org

California Community Colleges